"Emergency (Dial 999)" is the fifth single by English R&B band Loose Ends from their first studio album, A Little Spice, and was released in April 1984 by Virgin Records. The 7" and 12" Version were remixed versions from the forthcoming album "A Little Spice". The single reached number 41 in the UK charts.

Track listing
7” Single: VS677 
 "Emergency (Dial 999)"  3.50
 "Emergency (Dial 999) (Dub Mix)"  4.00

12” Single: VS677-12
 "Emergency (Dial 999) (Extended Remix)"  6.42  *
 "Emergency (Dial 999) (Dub Mix)"  5.55

The Extended Remix version was released on CD on the U.S. Version of the 'A Little Spice' album (MCAD27141) and also on the limited 3" CD Single of 'Hangin' On A String [Contemplating]' (Cat. No. CDT39).

Chart performance

References

External links
 Emergency (Dial 999) (1984) at Discogs.

1984 songs
1984 singles
Loose Ends (band) songs
Song recordings produced by Nick Martinelli
Songs written by Carl McIntosh (musician)
Songs written by Jane Eugene
Songs written by Steve Nichol